Mademoiselle Mozart (US title: Meet Miss Mozart) is a 1935 French comedy/drama genre film directed, produced and written by Yvan Noé.

Plot
A man falls in love with the pretty manager of a store of music instruments, whose business works badly. He is going to re-float the store to conquer her heart.

Main characters
Danielle Darrieux as  Denise, alias Mademoiselle Mozart 
Pierre Mingand as  Maxime Lecourtois 
Louis Baron jr. as  Alfred Pascoureau 
Pauline Carton as  Annette 
Christiane Dor as  Suzy 
Pierrette Caillol as  Loulou 
Maximilienne as  Mme Lecourtois

References

External links

Mademoiselle Mozart at filmsdefrance.com
Mademoiselle Mozart at AlloCiné 

1930s French-language films
1935 films
1935 comedy-drama films
French black-and-white films
Films directed by Yvan Noé
French comedy-drama films
1930s French films